Debenham High Schools is a Church of England secondary school located in the village of Debenham in Suffolk, UK. The school accepts students who are between 11 and 16 years old and live in the catchment. Any spare places are then allocated to students outside of the catchment.

The school is currently headed by Simon Martin after Julia Upton became the new Headteacher of Kesgrave High School in September 2020.
On 1 January 2011, the school has become an academy.

Mission statement

History
The school was first opened as a Modern School in 1964, originally designed to cater for 250 students. The school primarily accepted students who were not offered places at the local grammar school. Before the school was built these students would have been taught in the local village schools of "Debenham, Stonham Aspal or at Framlingham".

Mr. Arthur Holifield was appointed the first Headmaster of the school and he appointed the first eleven teachers to the school.

The introduction of Comprehensive education in Suffolk, resulted in an expansion of the school and Debenham Modern School became Debenham High School in 1979.

"Following Mr. Holifield's retirement, Mrs. Angela McClelland was appointed Headteacher in 1983."

In 1989 Mr. Michael Crawshaw succeeded Mrs. Angela McClelland as Headteacher of the school. In 2006 he was awarded an OBE for services to education.

Following Mr. Crawshaw's retirement in 2012, Miss Julia Upton became the new school Headteacher.

Mr. Simon Martin then became Headteacher when Miss Upton moved to Kesgrave High School in 2020.

References

Academies in Suffolk
Educational institutions established in 1964
1964 establishments in England
Secondary schools in Suffolk
Church of England secondary schools in the Diocese of St Edmundsbury and Ipswich